The Minolta 9xi was, when released in 1992, an advanced 35 mm single-lens reflex camera design. It incorporated the world's fastest autofocus system (according to the company and when coupled to a xi series lens), had a maximum shutter speed of 1/12000 of a second and a 14-zone metering system.

The 9xi had been improved in many areas over the previous flagships, the 9000 and 8000i, including:
 A rugged construction with better moisture and dust sealing.
 Nearly the same shooting speed as the 9000, but without the additional heavy and bulky motor pack.
 An improved shutter speed from 1/8000 of a second (8000i) or 1/4000 (9000) to 1/12000 of a second due to carbon-reinforced shutter blades.
 A pentaprism where information was projected directly in the image using transparent LCD technology.
 Compatibility with xi zoom lenses having a "power zoom function", allowing for extra functionality.
 An improved synchronization time for the new set of flashguns launched.
 A more contemporary, arguably even futuristic, design.
 Many more improvements.

Design
The Minolta 9xi was a bold design compared to its rivals and predecessors. It had smoothed contours completely unlike the previous 9-class camera the Minolta 9000, and unlike many competing cameras. Buttons were largely hidden, or placed directly by the fingers controlling them. This led to unusually clean aesthetics and an uncluttered appearance.

Technology
The Minolta 9xi is, to this day, still impressive in terms of technological ability. Nearly 5 frames per second without an external motor or battery pack was uncommon for its day, coupled with the four-sensor autofocus system that could continuously track not only horizontally but vertically and diagonally—even when an object came towards the camera. The autofocus system could focus at light levels of −1 ev and up to 19 ev (at ISO 100). It also used a 14-segment light metering system, variations of it being used for many years in most Minolta cameras. It featured a 1/300 of a second x-sync flash synchronization with stepless shutter speeds from 1/12000 of a second to 30sec in Program and Aperture Priority mode. A mechanical shutter this fast is still uncommon more than 25 years later.

The 9xi had many other abilities, many perhaps hidden at first sight. The camera could, without any external backs like the Minolta 9000 or cards like the Minolta 8000i, bracket 3 exposures each one 1/2 a stop different (each way). It could control a wireless flash system, if Minolta's 5400xi flash or the special "wireless flash controller" was used, at speeds of 1/60 of a second (1/30 in ratio); this was remarkable technology at the time. The 9xi was also capable of detecting if the photographer had their eye placed against the viewfinder; it was named "eye-start", and in essence, enabled the camera to start checking exposure and focus when the user either had their hand on the grip and/or when they looked through the viewfinder. This, in theory, allowed users to take a photo more quickly.

Criticism
The 9xi was and is criticized for many design choices. One was that it used the "creative cards" system, cards adding cost and being impractical for the camera's intended market. These cards worked in the same way as the 8000i's had and gave the photographer more "creative techniques" when inserted into the camera. However, some functions (the "custom functions" card being the main offender) were clearly already present in the camera, and only accessible by buying the card—this was seen as an attempt to "milk" the market. Another problem was the cameras' lack of built-in flash. This was an attempt by Minolta to appeal to more professionally inclined photographers, but it also negated the camera's built-in support for the wireless flash system (a main selling point) as an additional accessory was needed—unlike on the "less professional" 7xi.

The camera was also criticized for its heavily "computerized" interface, with few buttons and many vital functions only accessible behind the card door. It featured an interface with a few single buttons toggling between several crucial functions, and then using the front and back wheels to set options. While theoretically very fast to operate if properly learned, it was completely different from interfaces used on cameras before, and it has never been used since. Also, the physical interface included some arguably strange design choices, like having a large "Program reset" button as one of the few actual buttons (the target market hardly interested in that specific feature) as well as one small button deeply sunk into the body, hard to access for many users and of dubious utility.

The 9xi used both the older Minolta AF lenses and the xi-series lenses. Some of the new xi lenses had a new "powerzoom" function where the zoom ring electronically zoomed the lens via a motor. This allowed for a few extra functions, such as auto-zoom and zooming effects while exposing; in practice, however, it was slower to use, drained camera batteries and prevented pre-xi camera bodies from accepting the lenses because they did not have the ability to power the zoom. The xi-series lenses was not a success, and power-zooming lenses largely disappeared from the camera market until the function reappeared in lenses marketed to videographers with modern video-shooting SLRs.

The display system, while innovative with its projected information directly in the image, unfortunately, made the viewfinder darker due to the LCD overlay. The LCD elements were not lit, so it was impossible to see the LCD overlay—including focus areas—in the dark.

Lastly, the 9xi lacked a real vertical grip, only having a "battery grip" extending the handgrip slightly while adding support for AA batteries. This grip completely lacked controls of any kind, even a shutter release button.

The xi series is largely seen as a bold but failed attempt to take SLR photography in a different direction. For the following cameras, the si series, Minolta went for a much more traditional approach, culminating in their last "single-digit series" film cameras where most everything was controlled by an unusual number of separate buttons—the antithesis of the xi series. This later design was continued in the Konica Minolta and Sony era.

Specification

The Minolta Dynax/Maxxum specifications are as follows:
 AF system: Minolta's through-the-lens (TTL) phase-detection system with four CCD sensors; activated by Eye-start; multi-dimensional predictive focus control; built in AF illuminator automatically activated in low light or low contrast conditions; AF sensitivity range: EV −1 to 19 (at ISO100); AF illuminator range: 0.7 to 9 m (based on Minolta's standard test methods)
 Metering: TTL-type; 14-segment honeycomb-pattern silicon photocell (SPC) automatically activated by Eye-start; second SPC for TTL flash metering of dedicated flash unit; range: honeycomb-pattern EV 0–20, center-weighted average EV 0–20, spot EV 3–20 (ISO100, 50 mm f1.4 lens)
 Shutter Electronically controlled, vertical-traverse, focal-plane type; automatic speeds: in P and A modes, stepless 1/12000 to 30 seconds with nearest half-stop displayed; manual speeds: in S and M modes, 1/12000 to 30 sec in nearest 1/2-stop increments plus BULB in M modes; x-sync shutter speed: 1/300 second; x-sync shutter speed in wireless/remote flash mode: 1/60 (1/30 second in ratio)
 Viewfinder: Eye-level fixed pentaprism showing 92% of vertical and 94% of horizontal field of view; magnification: 0.75× with 50 mm lens at infinity; transparent LCD screen and Acute-Matte screen; diopter: −2.5 to +0.5 adjustable; long eye-relief.
 Focusing screen Changeable at an authorized Minolta service facility; type L (matte field with grid) or type S (matte field with vertical-horizontal scales)
 Film-speed range Automatic range: ISO 25–5000 in 1/3-stop increments; manual range: ISO 6–6400 in 1/3-stop increments
 Power 6-volt 2CR5 lithium battery
 Battery performance Approximately 50 rolls (based on Minolta's standard test method, using 24-exposure rolls)
 Dimensions 6 7/16 × 3 7/8 × 2 1/2 inches (163 × 98.5 × 64 mm)
 Weight  without lens and battery; Quartz Data Back model:  without lens and battery

Specifications and accessories are based on the latest information available at the time of printing and are subject to change without notice.

References

135 film cameras
9xi
Products introduced in 1992